Vani Vilasa Sagara, popularly known as Mari Kanive is a dam in Hiriyur Taluk, Chitradurga District, in the Indian state of Karnataka. It is located about 20 km south-westerly to Hiriyur, 32 km north-easterly to Hosadurga, 58 km south-easterly to Holalkere, 50 km northerly to Huliyar, 60 km southerly to Chitradurga, and 180 km north-westerly to Bangalore.

Vani Vilasa Sagara was built by the Mysore Maharajas pre-independence across the river Vedavathi. Vani Vilasa Sagara is the oldest dam in the state. The dam is an exquisite piece of architecture, an engineering marvel for that time. The dam irrigates a large area of the Deccan region of Central Karnataka, which is otherwise largely a dry land. It irrigates more than 100 km² of land in Hiriyur taluk through right and left bank canals. Vani Vilasa Sagara dam is also the source of domestic water for Hiriyur, Hosadurga Chitradurga and Challakere.

History
Vani Vilasa Sagara across the river Vedavathi was built by the Mysore Maharajas pre-independence. The project was initiated by the regent Queen Maharani Kempa Nanjammani Vani Vilasa Sannidhana who was a widow of Maharaja Chamaraaja Wadiyar. She is known for her exemplary social works. For the construction of this dam royals of Mysore had to pledge royal jewellery due to shortage of money, that is why it was named as "Vani Vilasa Sagara". The Mari Kanive irrigation project was initiated by Sir. Mark Cubbon, the British Resident of Mysore. Further improvements to the dam was initiated by Diwan Sheshadri Iyer in 1897 at the order of his Highness the Maharaja of Mysore Sri Krishnaraja Wadiyar IV. Vani Vilasa Sagara is higher than KRS dam of Mysore.

Features
The dam is capable of storing 30Tmcft of water. The dam has full reservoir level(FRL) of 130 feet mark, but its water level is measurable upto 135 feet, which was attained only in the year 1933. The dam crossed 120 feet mark numerous times, namely in 1932, 1934, 1956, 1957, 1958, 2000, 2021 and 2022.
On September 2,2022, milestone was reached after 89 years, when the dam was filled till brim at 130feet with inflow of over 3,000 cusecs.

Upper Bhadra Project
Due to insufficient water quantity in the reservoir, to cater the drinking and irrigation needs of people in Chitradurga district and eastern part of Chikkamagaluru district, the Government of Karnataka, has made a milestone project called Upper-Bhadra project. As per the project, 17 TMC ft. of water from Tunga Gajanur Dam and 12.50 TMC ft. of water from Bhadra dam is channeled to Vani Vilasa Sagar dam.

Tourism
The dam has been a tourist attraction for many years, but has been apparently neglected as a prime tourist destination. Recently, though, the development work undertaken by the forest department to restore the nearby forest cover, and the 'panchavati' gardens - a garden of medicinal plants with the old Indian cultural theme has improved the tourist figures, making it a popular weekend picnic spot. The 'panchavati' garden has medicinal plants lined up representing cultural themes - the 'Rashis', 'Sapta swaras', 'Nava grahas' and many more. The tourists who visit Chitradurga and Hosdurga often visit Mari kanive on the way. The historic maarikaamba temple here also attracts many tourists. The place is around 20 km drive from Hiriyur on a deviation from NH4 (Bangalore - Mumbai National Highway).

The backwaters of the dam is tailormade for water sports. The Youth Services and Sports Department has chalked out a programme to draw more youngsters towards adventure sport in the region. With the help of General Thimayya Adventure Sports Academy, an adventure sport centre is being planned at a cost of Rs 2.5 crore.

Directions
Vanivilas dam is about 160 km from Bangalore.  So it is advisable to tag Chitradurga fort with this beautiful place.  No clear sign boards are available on the highway (but one landmark is there,after we reach nd cross hiriyur bypass,on right side from Bangalore to Puna highway we see one sugar factory opposite side service road we take left nd go straight in 18 km), so once you reach Hiryur, slow down for the next 5 km and ask the locals for the correct deviation. Once the deviation is taken clear sign boards are available and the place is about 20 km from the deviation from the highway.

Gallery

References 

 

Dams in Karnataka
Kingdom of Mysore
Buildings and structures in Chitradurga district
Year of establishment missing